Slow Country may refer to:

Slow Country (film), a 2017 Nigerian film
"Slow Country", a poem by David Wagoner
"Slow Country", a 2001 song by Gorillaz from Gorillaz